The Stade de Gerland (known for sponsorship reasons as Matmut Stadium de Gerland and otherwise known as Municipal de Gerland or Stade Gerland ) is a stadium in the city of Lyon, France, which serves as home to Top 14 rugby club Lyon OU. It has a seating capacity of 35,000.

Situated in the Gerland quarter, it was used by French professional football club Olympique Lyonnais, who moved to the newly constructed Parc Olympique Lyonnais in 2016. Local rugby union club Lyon OU moved in beginning of 2017, replacing their much smaller stadium Matmut Stadium. The stadium's capacity was also reduced from 43,000 to a more reasonable 25,000.

The Stade de Gerland is listed as a Category three stadium by UEFA's standards and has hosted matches for the 1954 and 1972 Rugby League World Cups, UEFA Euro 1984, the 1998 FIFA World Cup, and the 2007 Rugby World Cup.

The stadium has hosted concerts by many famous artists, including The Rolling Stones, Michael Jackson, David Bowie, Pink Floyd and Genesis.

History
In 1910, the mayor of Lyon, Édouard Herriot, came up with the idea to develop and build a sports stadium with an athletics track and a velodrome in the city. In 1912, the stadium was officially mandated and local architect Tony Garnier was given the reins to designing and constructing it. Construction began in 1914 with hopes that the stadium would be completed before the International Exhibition of 1914. However, due to World War I, construction was temporarily halted, but resumed following the wars conclusion in 1919 with the assistance of a large number of German POWs. By 1920, the stadium was completely functional. In 1926, the Stade de Gerland was inaugurated by Herriot.

The stadium originally had a cycling track, but it was removed in order to increase the seating capacity to 50,000. In 1984, minor renovations were made to the stadium by architect Rene Gagis in order to bring the stadium up to standards for UEFA Euro 1984. This included construction of the Jean Bouin and Jean Jaurès stands. Further renovations were needed to prepare the stadium for the 1998 FIFA World Cup, as by that time FIFA had mandated that all stadiums used for international matches, including the World Cup, had to be all-seated. The north and south stands were completely dismantled and rebuilt, the Jean Jaurès and Jean Bouin side stands were untouched and the athletics track that had remained, even after the cycling track had been removed, was taken out. The renovations were done by architect Albert Constantin. The new incarnation of Gerland had a maximum capacity of 40,500.

From 1950 to 2015 the stadium was home to French professional football club Olympique Lyonnais. Lyon moved into the stadium as a result of splitting from the Lyon Olympique Universitaire sport club, which played at the Stade des Iris. Its record attendance for a Ligue 1 match is 48,552 set during a match between Olympique Lyonnais and Saint-Étienne in 1982.

Artists

Stade de Gerland can also used for events with mass audiences, such as concerts; in the past, it has hosted artists such as the Rolling Stones, Michael Jackson, Pink Floyd, and Genesis.

UEFA Euro 1984
The stadium was one of the venues of the UEFA Euro 1984, and held the following matches:

1998 FIFA World Cup
The stadium was one of the venues of the 1998 FIFA World Cup, and held the following matches:

2003 FIFA Confederations Cup
The stadium was one of the venues of the 2003 FIFA Confederations Cup, and held the following matches:

On 26 June 2003, Cameroon faced Colombia in the semi-final, held here. In the 72nd minute of the match Marc-Vivien Foé collapsed in the centre circle with no other players near him. After attempts to resuscitate him on the pitch, he was stretchered off the field, where he received mouth-to-mouth resuscitation and oxygen. Medics spent 45 minutes attempting to restart his heart, and although he was still alive upon arrival at the stadium's medical centre, he died shortly afterwards. A first autopsy did not determine an exact cause of death, but a second autopsy concluded that Foé's death was heart-related as it discovered evidence of hypertrophic cardiomyopathy, a hereditary condition known to increase the risk of sudden death during physical exercise.

2007 Rugby World Cup
The stadium hosted three pool matches in the 2007 Rugby World Cup: Australia vs Japan, Argentina vs Georgia and New Zealand vs Portugal.

Rugby League
The stadium's first World Cup match was in 1954, when Great Britain beat Australia.

Stade de Gerland played host to the 1972 Rugby League World Cup Final between Great Britain and Australia. The French public seemed uninterested in a final that did not involve the French team, as only 4,231 spectators turned up. The game will always be remembered by the British for their captain Clive Sullivan's wonderful long distance try, and by the Australians for perhaps "The greatest try never scored", later shown on TV to be legitimately scored by Australian fullback Graeme Langlands, but disallowed by French referee Georges Jameau who believed him to be offside (TV footage indicated Langlands had been approximately one metre behind halfback Dennis Ward as he put up his kick). Lions hooker Mike Stephenson scored the 73rd-minute try that helped Great Britain level the scores and secure the World Cup. Had Aussie winger Ray Branighan succeeded with a 79th-minute penalty, or Bob Fulton landed one of three drop goal attempts in the last five minutes, the cup could easily have gone to Australia. But for the first time in the competition's history the scores were level at full time. An additional twenty minutes extra time was played, but no further score resulted, and Great Britain were awarded the cup by virtue of a better W-L record and due to having defeated Australia earlier in the tournament.

See also
 Parc de Gerland

References

External links

 Official website

7th arrondissement of Lyon
1938 FIFA World Cup stadiums
1998 FIFA World Cup stadiums
2003 FIFA Confederations Cup stadiums
Buildings and structures in Lyon
Gerland
Olympique Lyonnais
Gerland
Gerland
Gerland
Rugby League World Cup stadiums
Sports venues completed in 1926
Sports venues in Lyon
Gerland